James of Majorca may refer to:

 James of Majorca (monk)
 James I of Majorca
 James II of Majorca
 James III of Majorca
 James IV of Majorca